The Art of Walt Disney: From Mickey Mouse to the Magic Kingdoms (also known as The Art of Walt Disney) is a book by Christopher Finch, chronicling the artistic achievements and history of Walt Disney and The Walt Disney Company. The original edition was published in 1973; revised and expanded editions were issued in 1975, 1995, 2004, and 2011. The newest edition of the book covers a broad history of the company and specific sections for movies, Pixar, live action and the Theme parks. The latest edition also includes a foreword by John Lasseter.

Author Information 
Born in Guernsey, England in 1939, Finch began his painting career in Paris and in London at the Chelsea Art School, he transitioned into the field of writing about art for magazines. He went on to write about many famous artists and pop artists including Andy Warhol, Jasper Johns, Jim Dine, David Hockney, Ed Ruscha, and more. The first books he published were a collection of essays based on his work with artists and pop artists: Pop Art: Object & Image, Image as Language: Aspects of British Art, and a monograph about the work of Patrick Caulfield. Later, he became an associate curator at the Walker Art Center before going to New York to continue writing.  This is where he began the work The Art of Walt Disney and many other distinguished titles. After a long break from making art himself, in 1984 he returned to making graphics, photography, and paintings, some of which were featured in multiple galleries around the United States. He died in 2022 at the age of 82.

History
After Walt Disney became famous for his achievements, Christopher Finch decided to make a book called "Art of Walt Disney". Originally published in 1973, the book by Christopher Finch, Art of Walt Disney, is about the innovations of Walt Disney and it has been revised and expanded many different times and with in these many times, his definition of “Art” is always changing. This expansive revision of the 1973 edition contains seven additional chapters, with color illustrations, on Disney films such as Beauty and the Beast, Aladdin and The Lion King.

Background of Disney and His Art
Walter Elias Disney was born on December 5, 1901 in Chicago, Illinois. He moved to Marceline, Missouri with his family as a young child. He had four siblings who later aided in his successful company. Not long after, Walt began drawing and painting, even going so far as to paint farm animals on the side of his family’s home. Four years later, his father fell sick and the family moved again to Kansas City. Walt had to help, at age nine, deliver The Kansas City Star and The Kansas City Times newspapers with his father Elias Disney and his brother Roy Oliver Disney in the hours before school and again after school, however he still continued his passion for art. As he got older, he continued with his drawing and started selling his pictures to neighbors and friends. In high school, His family then moved back to Chicago where Walt was an active member of his school’s newspaper, whom he drew cartoons for, while also dividing much of his time to photography. In 1917, he joined efforts in Europe during World War I then returned ultimately to Kansas City to graduate high school and start his first animation series. After meeting his life long friend Ub Iwerks, As a young adult, Walt not only continued his drawing and painting, but also starting working with animation and made short animated videos for the company he worked for at the time, Pesman-Rubin Commercial Art Studio. Walt eventually left that company due to layoffs, and instead decided with his friend, Ub Iwerks, to start their own company called Iwerks-Disney Commercial Artists. Unfortunately, Walt and Ub’s company did not last very long, and they soon found new jobs at a new company, the Kansas City Film Ad Company, formally known as the Kansas City Slide Company. Here, Walt learned even more about the art of animation, and contributed to creating commercials that played before movies. It was not long after when Walt decided to leave the Kansas City Film Ad Company to start another one of his own, called Laugh-O-Gram Films, where he created his first popular cartoon called Alice’s Wonderland, which turned into a series called Alice Comedies. Unfortunately for Walt, not enough money was coming in, which lead to many of his employees quitting his company, and forcing him to declare bankruptcy. He moved to Hollywood and started the Disney Brothers Studio.

In 1927, Walt created a new character called Oswald the Lucky Rabbit, which also became popular. However, the distributor he was working with at the time, Charles Mintz, hired all of Walt’s animation employees and told him that he had no rights to Oswald, because the cartoon was not copyrighted under Walt’s name. After, Walt, his brother Roy O. Disney, and Ub Iwerks, came together to create all new characters, all of which Walt was going to make sure he owned. Mickey Mouse was soon developed, a character Walt had been inspired to create just from a simple pet mouse he once had in his office back in Missouri. He had to go through many hurdles with Charles Mintz, Walt's distributor, before winning the rights to his character. The name of his company was changed to The Walt Disney Studio the same year he married Lillian Bounds with whom he had two daughters, Sharon and Diane. During World War II he produced fan favorites such as Fantasia, Pinocchio, Dumbo, and Bambi. He continued to have monumental success into he 1950's and 60's.  He holds the record for most Academy Awards won, the George Washington Award, and the Presidential Medal of Freedom from President Lyndon B Johnson.  He helped established the California Institute of the Arts in 1961. Five years later, in 1966, he passed away due to lung cancer, but his work and legacy live on.

The Art of Walt Disney Contents  
Part I: A New Art Form

 Early Enterprises
 Mickey Mouse and Silly Symphonies 
 Six Cartoon Classics
 Hyperion Days

Part II: Feature Animation

 Snow White: The First Feature 
 Pinocchio
 Fantasia: The Great Experiment
 Dumbo and Bambi
 Interruptions and Innovations
 Later Animation

Part III: Live Action Films

 Actors and Animals
 Davy Crockett, Other Heroes and Mary Poppins

Part IV: The Magic Kingdoms

 Beyond Film: Disneyland and Walt Disney World

Details of Above Works 
Disney's Silly Symphonies (1928-1934) featured Mickey Mouse and other characters to present color cartoons and short films by Walt Disney. These were to include Steamboat Willie, etc.

The Six Cartoon Classics include Who Killed Cock Robin, The Cookie Carnival, Broken Toys, Music Land, Mickey's Service Station, and The Band Concert.

Snow White: First Feature, released in theaters in 1937, was Disney's first full length film which showcased over 200 of Disney's drawings, early works and story sketches.

Pinocchio (1940) was the second full film by Walt Disney, and it is widely applauded for its early usage of visual language.

Fantasia (1940) drew the attention and spotlight back to Mickey Mouse after much success with Donald Duck. It is a movie concert composed of eight magical sections with an emphasis on classical music.

Dumbo (1941)  is a film take on the Ugly Duckling throw the lease of a circus Elephant, and Bambi (1942), based on Felix Salten's book Bambi, takes a more realistic following of animals compared to his other works featuring animals which had a large emphasis on fantasy.

The Later Animations section of this book zooms in on works such as One Hundred and One Dalmatians, The Sword and the Stone, The Jungle Book, The Aristocats, Winnie The Pooh and the Blustery Day, and Robin Hood.

Actors and Animals digs more into Disney's first works with live actors and television work. Some of these include Treasure Island, Seal Island, The Living Desert, The Vanishing Prairie, and The African Lion.

Mary Poppins, featuring Julie Andrews, was released in 1964 showcased a blending of animation and live acting.  The story was based on P.L. Traver's stories.

Disneyland and Walt Disney World are the two Magical Kingdoms that Disney created with the intention of making the amusement parks and playground experience more suitable for kids and adults alike.

Editions
Since its release in 1973, The Art of Walt Disney has expanded and revised its content on four separate occasions; 1975, 1995, 2004, and 2011. Each edition and revision elaborates on the growth of the Walt Disney company throughout the years. Paying attention to the inspiration and creations of drawings, cover art, theme park additions and attractions, archives, and interviews with employees.

1975
In 1975, Christopher Finch released the first revised, expanded edition of The Art of Walt Disney. Finch includes the creative process of Walt Disney, and how his imagination created concepts and creatures that helped build the company. Information throughout the book is compiled from interviews with staff members, archives, theme park concepts, and illustrations.

1995
The 1995 edition of The Art of Walt Disney discusses the development of the Walt Disney company over the past 20 years since the last edition in 1975. Finch examines the history of Disney’s cover art, the illustration, imagination, and animation cels behind newly released films such as The Lion King, Beauty and the Beast, and Aladdin. Adding in information on previously-unpublished concept art, and Disney theme park additions.

2004
2004 revised edition of the book, focuses on Walt Disney’s achievements as a company. Incorporating interviews of previous and current staff members, decades of film stills, hundreds of illustrations and concept art.

2011
2011 is another revised edition that further explains the expansion and development of the Walt Disney company. Bringing in more information on the company’s connection with Pixar films. This revision goes into greater detail with the process of ideas, illustrations, concept art, theme park additions, films, and animations.

References

Books about visual art
Books about Disney